The Bangladesh Post Office also known by trade name Bangla Post is a government-operated agency responsible for providing postal services in Bangladesh. It is a subsidiary of the Ministry of Posts, Telecommunications and Information Technology. This ministry is concerned with the policymaking for its two attached departments. The Director General of Bangladesh Post Office is Md Harunur Rashid.

Services

The main services of the Bangladesh post office are to mail letters, Postal Life Insurance (PLI), post cards, parcels, newspapers and periodicals, books, or packets. The general delivery time is 2–3 days depending upon the distance and communication of destination.

Electronic Money Transfer Service (EMTS) is one of the service which started operations 26 March 2010. This service was commercially launched in a limited scope (in 104 post offices) on 10 May 2010. However, in response of overwhelming demand, this service has now been expanded in 2750 post offices throughout the country including all district Head Post Offices, upazila and important/busy rural post offices. This service has got wide acceptability and popularity within a short period of time, which can be regarded as a significant achievement of the present government.

Postal Cash Card is a debit card. Start operation at 26 March 2010. Now available at all district, upazila and important/selected post offices. Purchase a postal cash card will cost BDT 45.00 which includes minimum balance of BDT 10.00. No yearly charge or profit/interest against customer balance. Service: Cash in, Cash out, Balance transfer to other card, Transaction with POS & ATM located at post offices or QCASH marked POS/ATM booths.

Dak Taka
Dak Taka is a mobile banking service announced by the post office in December 2017. According to the post office, it will bring financial services to unbanked villagers through its more than 8,000 offices. Its stated goal was to be operational within three months and bring 30 million of the unbanked into the system within a year.

A customer can open an account by depositing a minimum of two taka. They can make deposits and withdrawals at a post office or with postal cash cards. Dak Taka makes their phone into a digital wallet. They can make bill payments and transactions with other financial institutions using an app. While shopping, they can make payments with their phone using NFC (near-field communication) or by scanning a QR code.

E-Post

Electronic Mail Service was introduced as "E-Post" from 16 Aug 2000. The ePost service enabled people to send and receive messages or scanned images through e-mail from selected Post offices in the country. This service is now available in 16 Head Post offices, namely Dhaka GPO, Chittagong GPO, Sylhet HPO, Moulavibazar HPO, Feni HPO and Comilla HPO. Noakhali HPO, Mymensingh HPO, Jessore HPO, Kushtia HPO, Barisal HPO, Bogra HPO, Sirajganj HPO  From 2015 the Post department started its e-commerce services.

Gallery

See also

 Nagad

References

External links 
 Bangladesh Post Office

Postal organizations
Postal system of Bangladesh
Government agencies of Bangladesh